Agyneta serrata is a species of sheet weaver found in Canada and the United States. It was described by Emerton in 1909.

References

serrata
Spiders described in 1909
Spiders of North America